Datuan is a town in Rongcheng City, Weihai, in eastern Shandong province, China. , it administers the following 45 villages:
Datuan Village
Zhoujiazhuang Village
Chijiadian Village
Yuebozhuang Village
Liujiatun Village
Nanshijiang Village
Danigou Village
Xiaonigou Village
Dawolong Village
Dongtahou Village
Xitahou Village
Gushiwujia Village
Gushidujia Village
Huili Village
Donggounantuan Village
Donggoubeituan Village
Dongzhongyao Village
Xizhongyao Village
Yaoxijiang Village
Gaojiazhuang Village
Zoushandong Village
Houtou Village
Huangzhuang Village
Dazhuji Village
Zhuji Village
Dongxujia Village
Xixujia Village
Xiahe Village
Shuangshiyujia Village
Shuangshidongjia Village
Jiangjiatun Village
Shuangshizhoujia Village
Shuangshisunjia Village
Shuangshiyinjia Village
Hushantun Village
Songzhuang Village
Buluo Village
Beilingchang Village
Nanwangzhuang Village
Beiwangzhuang Village
Hejiazhuang Village
Sizhangxiangyang Village
Wantou Village
Donglingchang Village
Xilingchang Village

References

Township-level divisions of Shandong
Rongcheng, Shandong